The Main Street Cinema is a small movie theater currently located on Main Street, U.S.A. at Disneyland and previously at the Magic Kingdom and Tokyo Disneyland.

Disneyland Version
When the theater opened on the park's opening day on July 17, 1955, the cinema showed many silent movies, including films starring Charlie Chaplin and Douglas Fairbanks. In the 1970's, these were replaced with several Disney shorts on six different screens while a recorded musical accompaniment plays. Five of the six shorts are played without sound and are changed from time to time. The sixth short is always Mickey Mouse's 1928 cartoon classic Steamboat Willie, which is played with its original sound, albeit in an edited version to remove objectionable content; it includes an introduction prepared for a 1950s reissue reminding the viewer when the short was created, and that it is still screening today worldwide.

In 2010, for the 55th anniversary of the park, footage of Disneyland's opening day was shown.

In June 2019, displays selling Disney resort-brand merchandise were added inside the cinema. They were removed a week later after heavy criticism, and benches were added to give a better view of the featured films.

Original Films Shown
 Fatima's Dance (1903)
 A Dash Through the Clouds (1912)
 Gertie the Dinosaur (1914)
 The Noise of Bombs (1914)
 Dealing for Daisy (1915)
 Shifting Sands (1918)
 The Phantom of the Opera (1925)

Magic Kingdom Version
The version at the Magic Kingdom is also located on Main Street, U.S.A., and opened with the park on October 1, 1971. As with the Disneyland version, the cinema at the Magic Kingdom originally showed silent movies before switching to Disney cartoons. By 1994, the cinema showed the Mickey's Audition short that was previously shown at Disney-MGM Studios. Here, it aired under the title of Mickey's Big Break.

In June 1998, the Cinema ceased showing cartoons and began to show previews of then-new Disney animated movies. By 2005, five of the screens were removed from the building when it became a venue for guests to play the Virtual Magic Kingdom online game, and the building was renamed as VMK Central. However, a single screen remained in the building which was used for showcasing promotional trailers or videos. VMK Central closed on September 30th, 2007, and was replaced with a gift shop called The Art of Disney in November 2007. It remained as such until 2021, when the store was closed and the artwork formerly housed there was relocated to a shop in Fantasyland.

In May 2021, the venue was used as a temporary location for the Sweets and Treats shop. For the 50th Anniversary Celebrations, the venue became home to The Magic of Walt Disney World, containing a shop known as the Walt Disney World Vault Collection Store.

Tokyo Disneyland Version
The Cinema at Tokyo Disneyland was housed in the World Bazaar, and operated from the park's opening day on April 15, 1983, until October 20, 2002, when the cinema closed to make way for an extension to the Imporium shop next-door, with the combined lot being renamed to the Grand Emporium in December 2002. The Main Street Cinema signage was removed in the process.

Hong Kong Disneyland Version
Although the attraction doesn't exist in Hong Kong Disneyland, a facade does for the building that houses the shop inside.

The first shop the building was home to was  Midtown Jewelry, a jewelry shop that operated from the park's opening day on September 12, 2005, until April 14, 2016.

On July 26, 2016, as part of the park's 10th Anniversary celebration, a Duffy the Disney Bear themed shop named My Journeys with Duffy opened, becoming a joint Duffy and Friends themed gift shop and Meet & Greet attraction.

See also
 List of Disneyland attractions

References

External links 
 
 Disneyland Resort attraction page for Main Street Cinema

Walt Disney Parks and Resorts attractions
Disneyland
Main Street, U.S.A.
Tokyo Disneyland
1955 establishments in California
1983 establishments in Japan
2002 disestablishments in Japan